Mustafa Abi (born 2 January 1979) is a Turkish professional basketball player.

External links
TBLStat.net Profile

1979 births
Living people
Turkish men's basketball players
Fenerbahçe men's basketball players
Anadolu Efes S.K. players
Ülker G.S.K. basketball players
Beşiktaş men's basketball players
Shooting guards